John Joseph "Jack" Geoghan (June4, 1935August23, 2003) was an American serial child rapist and Roman Catholic priest assigned to parishes in the Archdiocese of Boston in Massachusetts. He was reassigned to several parish posts involving interaction with children, even after receiving treatment for pedophilia.

The investigation and prosecution of Geoghan were one of the numerous cases of priests accused of child sexual abuse in a scandal that rocked the archdiocese in the 1990s and 2000s. It led to the resignation of Boston's archbishop, Cardinal Bernard Francis Law, on December 13, 2002. Law lost the support of fellow clergy and the laity after it was shown that his response to allegations against dozens of priests consisted of assigning them to different parishes, thus allowing sexual abuse of additional children to take place.

Geoghan was convicted of sexual abuse, laicized, and sentenced in 2002 to nine to ten years in Souza-Baranowski Correctional Center, a maximum security prison. Less than a year later, he was murdered there by Joseph Druce, an inmate serving a life sentence. The Boston Globes coverage of Geoghan's abuse opened the door for public knowledge of the sexual abuse scandal in the Catholic archdiocese of Boston and Catholic churches nationwide in general. This coverage is a key plot element of Tom McCarthy's film Spotlight (2015).

Career
Born in Boston in 1935 to an Irish Catholic family, John Joseph Geoghan attended local parochial schools. Intending to become a priest, he attended Cardinal O'Connell Seminary. An assessment in 1954 noted him as "markedly immature." He graduated in 1962 and was ordained.

On February 13, 1962, Geoghan was assigned as an assistant pastor at Blessed Sacrament Parish in Saugus, Massachusetts. That December, he successfully talked a man out of committing suicide from jumping off the Mystic River Bridge. While Geoghan was assigned to Blessed Sacrament, Anthony Benzevich allegedly told church officials that the junior priest was observed bringing boys into his bedroom. Benzevich would later deny this allegation. In 1998, Benzevich told reporters he was branded as a troublemaker for reporting Geoghan, and that church officials hinted that he might be sent to Peru if he persisted. In 1995 Geoghan admitted to having molested four boys during his tenure at Blessed Sacrament.

Geoghan was assigned to St. Bernard's Parish in Concord starting on September 22, 1966. He was transferred after seven months there; church records offered no explanation for his reassignment. On April 20, 1967, Geoghan was assigned to St. Paul's Parish in Hingham. Around 1968, a man complained to church authorities that he had caught Geoghan molesting his son. As a result, Geoghan was sent to the Seton Institute in Baltimore, Maryland, for treatment for his pedophilia. In the early 1970s, parishioner Joanne Mueller accused Geoghan of molesting her four young sons. Mueller has said that she informed Paul E. Miceli and he asked her to keep quiet. Miceli disputes her account. The church later reached a settlement with Mueller.

Geoghan's next assignment was at St. Andrew's Parish in Boston's Jamaica Plain neighborhood, starting on June 4, 1974. On February 9, 1980, John E. Thomas told Bishop Thomas Vose Daily that Geoghan admitted to molesting seven boys. Daily called Geoghan and told him to go home. Geoghan admitted to the abuse, but said that he did "not feel it serious or a pastoral problem." He was placed on sick leave three days later and ordered by Cardinal Humberto Medeiros to undergo counseling. Under the care of doctors Robert Mullins and John H. Brennan, Geoghan underwent psychoanalysis and psychotherapy.

On February 25, 1981, Geoghan returned to pastoral work at St. Brendan's Parish in Dorchester. While there, he allegedly raped and fondled a boy. In 1982 the family of seven of Geoghan's victims complained to Bishop Daily that Geoghan had arranged to meet one of his victims at an ice cream shop in Jamaica Plain and was at the time in the company of another boy. On September 18, 1984, Cardinal Bernard Francis Law, the new Archbishop of Boston, removed Geoghan from the parish after complaints that he was molesting children.

Law assigned Geoghan to St. Julia's Parish in Weston on November 13, 1984. He was put in charge of three youth groups, including altar boys. On December 7, auxiliary bishop John Michael D'Arcy wrote to Law complaining about Geoghan's assignment to St. Julia's because of his "history of homosexual involvement with young boys". That same month, Mullins wrote that Geoghan had "fully recovered", and Brennan stated that there was no need for restrictions on his work as a priest.

In 1986 new allegations of sexual abuse were made against Geoghan. From April 3–12, 1989, he was treated at the Saint Luke Institute in Silver Spring, Maryland, where he was diagnosed with homosexual pedophilia. On April 28, 1989, auxiliary bishop Robert Joseph Banks ordered Geoghan to leave the ministry. Instead, Geoghan was placed on sick leave on May 24 and, between August 10 to November 4, was treated at The Institute of Living in Hartford, Connecticut. Upon his release, Geoghan was described as "moderately improved". Institute officials recommended that he return to assignment. Banks was concerned about the conclusions of the institute's discharge summary. On December 13, the institute sent Banks a letter explaining the discharge summary, stating that, "The probability he [Geoghan] would act out again is quite low. However, we could not guarantee that it would not re-occur." Psychiatrists concluded that Geoghan had "atypical pedophilia in remission" and a "mixed personality disorder with obsessive-compulsive, histrionic and narcissistic features" but decided he could be safely reassigned.

On November 28, 1990, Banks recommended that Geoghan return to the parish, but left the decision up to Cardinal Law and another bishop. On October 23, 1991, the church received a complaint about Geoghan "proselytizing" with a boy at a pool.

Retirement
In 1993, Geoghan retired from active ministry at the age of 58. He moved into the Regina Cleri residence for retired priests. Three years later, after more allegations surfaced against him, he spent several months in therapy in the Southdown Institute in Ontario, Canada.

Sexual abuse charges
Over a 30-year career in six parishes, Geoghan was accused of sexual abuse involving more than 130 boys. He was prosecuted in Cambridge for charges of molestation that took place in 1991. Geoghan was defrocked in 1998 by Pope John Paul II. He was found guilty on February 21, 2002, of indecent assault and battery for grabbing the buttocks of a 10-year-old boy in a swimming pool at the Waltham Boys and Girls Club in 1991, and was sentenced to nine to ten years in prison.

After initially agreeing to a $30 million settlement with 86 of Geoghan's victims, the Boston archdiocese pulled out of it, finally settling with them for $10 million.

Boston's Suffolk County prosecuted Geoghan in two other sexual abuse cases. One case was dropped without prejudice when the alleged victim decided not to testify. In the second case, a judge dismissed the conviction of Geoghan in two rapes, after hotly contested arguments, because the statute of limitations had run out. The Commonwealth's appeal of that ruling was active at the time of Geoghan's death. Remaining charges of indecent assault in that case were still pending prosecution.

Murder
On August 23, 2003, while in protective custody at the maximum security Souza-Baranowski Correctional Center in Lancaster, Geoghan was strangled and stomped to death in his cell by inmate Joseph Druce. The latter was serving a sentence of life without the possibility of parole for killing a man who allegedly made sexual advances toward him. Druce was said to have planned the murder of Geoghan for more than a month, considering him a "prize". The press raised questions about prison officials' judgment in placing these two men in the same unit for protective custody. In addition, they had been warned by an inmate that Druce intended to attack Geoghan.

A Worcester jury found Druce guilty of first-degree murder on January 25, 2006, after the jury rejected his insanity defense. Druce was sentenced a second time to life in prison without the possibility of parole.

A video showing several corrections officers trying to open Geoghan's cell door, which Druce had wedged shut while he attacked the former priest, was released on YouTube in June 2007, along with videos showing resuscitation efforts on Geoghan by emergency personnel. Officials claimed not to know how the videos, recorded by the prison surveillance systems, were made public.

Geoghan was buried in Holyhood Cemetery in Brookline, Massachusetts, on August 28, 2003.

Effects of the Geoghan case on other church leaders

Robert Joseph Banks
Robert Joseph Banks, when an auxiliary bishop in Boston, had recommended in 1989 that Geoghan remain as a parish priest despite receiving an assessment that he would likely continue to act on his pedophilia. Banks was appointed bishop of the Diocese of Green Bay in 1990. He retired in 2003, having reached the church's mandatory retirement age of 75 years. Banks remains Bishop Emeritus of Green Bay.

John Michael D'Arcy
John Michael D'Arcy, who had written an unheeded letter of warning to Cardinal Law about Geoghan's behavior, was transferred from Boston to Indiana on February 26, 1985, and ended his career as bishop of the Diocese of Fort Wayne–South Bend. D'Arcy retired in 2009 and died in 2013.

Bernard Francis Law
After Cardinal Law resigned as Boston's archbishop in December 2002, he relocated to Rome in 2004 where he served as archpriest of the Basilica of St. Mary Major, the largest Catholic Marian church in Rome. It was "commonly believed that he would live out his retirement in Rome" after he retired at age 80 in 2011. Law died in Rome on December 20, 2017.

In popular culture
Canadian punk-rock band Billy Talent's song "Devil in a Midnight Mass" from the album Billy Talent II (2006) addresses Geoghan's story from a victim's perspective.

The 2015 film Spotlight depicts the Boston Globe investigation into the Boston Archdiocese, spurred by Geoghan's trial that would lead to his eventual imprisonment. Geoghan is briefly depicted in the film in a scene taking place in 1976 at a Boston police station, played by an uncredited actor.

See also
Catholic Church sexual abuse cases
Crimen sollicitationis
Pontifical secret
Deliver Us from Evil (2006 film)
Sex Crimes and the Vatican (Panorama documentary episode)
Barbara Blaine, founder of SNAP (Survivors Network for those Abused by Priests)
John Jay Report

References

External links
Diocesan and court records relating to John Geoghan

1935 births
2003 deaths
2003 murders in the United States
20th-century American Roman Catholic priests
20th-century American criminals
21st-century American criminals
American people who died in prison custody
American people convicted of indecent assault
American rapists
Catholic Church sexual abuse scandals in the United States
Laicized Roman Catholic priests
Clergy from Boston
Roman Catholic Archdiocese of Boston
People from Saugus, Massachusetts
Prisoners murdered in custody
Prisoners who died in Massachusetts detention
American people of Irish descent
People murdered in Massachusetts
Murdered criminals
American murder victims
Deaths by beating in the United States
Deaths by strangulation in the United States
Criminals from Massachusetts
American people convicted of child sexual abuse
Catholic priests convicted of child sexual abuse
Catholics from Massachusetts
American members of the clergy convicted of crimes
Burials at Holyhood Cemetery (Brookline)
Violence against men in North America
People with personality disorders